Kurier is a German-language daily newspaper based in Vienna, Austria.

History and profile
Kurier was founded as Wiener Kurier by the United States Forces in Austria (USFA) in 1945, during the Allied occupation after World War II. In 1954 the paper was acquired and re-established by Ludwig Polsterer as Neuer Kurier (New Kurier).

Funke Mediengruppe holds 49% of the paper. The company also partly owns Kronen Zeitung. The publisher of Kurier is Kurier-Zeitungsverlag und Druckerei GmbH. Kurier is based in Vienna.

Circulation
Kurier was the eighteenth largest newspaper worldwide with a circulation of 443,000 copies in the late 1980s. It was the third best-selling Austrian newspaper in 1993 with a circulation of 390,000 copies.

Kurier sold 263,000 copies in 2001. It was the third best selling Austrian newspaper in 2002 with a circulation of 252,000 copies. The daily had a circulation of 254,000 copies in 2004. Its circulation in 2005 was 172,000 copies. The 2007 circulation of the paper was 169,481 copies. The paper sold 158,469 copies in 2011. The circulation of the paper was 385,000 copies in 2013.

References

External links

 Official website 

1954 establishments in Austria
Daily newspapers published in Austria
German-language newspapers published in Austria
Newspapers published in Vienna
Publications established in 1954